Xeniostoma inexpectans is a species of sea snail, a marine gastropod mollusc in the family Calliostomatidae.

Description
The height of the thin, silvery white shell attains 8.7 mm.

Distribution
This marine species occurs off the Aleutian Islands, Alaska, at depths between 200 m and 400 m.

References

External links
 To World Register of Marine Species

inexpectans
Gastropods described in 2012